Hason Aaron Graham (born March 21, 1971) is a retired American football wide receiver and kick returner. He played in 19 games during 1995 and 1996 seasons with the New England Patriots of the National Football League. He played college football at the University of Georgia.

With the Patriots, Graham appeared in 19 games, including a start during his rookie year. He caught 15 passes for 220 yards and 2 touchdowns.

He was born in Decatur, Georgia.

References

1971 births
Living people
Players of American football from Georgia (U.S. state)
American football wide receivers
Hinds Eagles football players
Georgia Bulldogs football players
New England Patriots players
People from Decatur, Georgia